Mmaishibe Rebecca Seono is a South African politician who has represented the African National Congress (ANC) in the Limpopo Provincial Legislature since 2019. She was elected to her seat in the 2019 general election, ranked 38th on the ANC's party list. She chairs the legislature's portfolio committee on transport and community safety.

References

External links 

 

Living people
Year of birth missing (living people)
Members of the Limpopo Provincial Legislature
African National Congress politicians
21st-century South African politicians
21st-century South African women politicians
Women members of provincial legislatures of South Africa